The National Digital library of India is a virtual repository of learning resources which is not only just a repository with a search/browse facilities but also provides a host of services containing textbooks, articles, videos, audio books, lectures, simulations, fiction and all other kinds of learning media for the learners/users community. It is a project under Ministry of Education, Government of India , through its National Mission on Education through Information and Communication Technology (NMEICT). The objective is to collect and collate metadata and provide full text index from several national and international digital libraries, as well as other relevant sources. The NDLI provides free of cost access to many books and designed to hold content of any languages and provides interface support for 10 most widely used Indian languages. It is developed, operated and maintained from Indian Institute of Technology Kharagpur.

Thr digital library of India is also available on google play store.

History and Timeline
The Library was launched in pilot form in May 2016.

The Library was dedicated to the nation on June 19, 2018, by union human resource minister Prakash Javadekar.

As of April 2019, NDLI hosts 4,58,25,715+ (4.5 crore+) items in its repository, with over 1,50,000 volumes in English.

Languages
The scanning of Indian language books has created an opportunity for developing Indian language optical character recognition (OCR) software. This is a digital repository containing textbooks, articles, videos, audio books, lectures, simulations, fiction and all other kinds of learning media. The NDLI provides free of cost access to many books in the Indian languages and English.

Access and restrictions
User registration is open to users from around the world. However, contents from some popular sources are only accessible to registered users. Some of these registration-only works are from sources such as:

 World eBook Library
 South Asia Archive
 OECD iLibrary
 Satyajit Ray Society

Delivery formats
Access can also be had via mobile app, available for Android at Google Play.

Management
The Library is managed by Indian Institute of Technology, Kharagpur

See also
 Digital Library of India
 Traditional Knowledge Digital Library
 Panjab Digital Library
 Open access in India

References
 Retrieved on 05-05-2022
 Retrieved on 05-05-2022

External links
 

Historiography of India
Libraries in Bangalore
Indian digital libraries
Indian Institute of Science
2016 establishments in Karnataka
Libraries established in 2016